Ghostland (also known as Incident in a Ghostland) is a 2018 horror film  written and directed by Pascal Laugier. Ghostland was shown in competition at the Festival international du film fantastique de Gérardmer, where it won three awards, including the Grand Prize.

Plot
A woman named Colleen travels with her teenage daughters Beth and Vera to their recently deceased aunt Clarisse's secluded home after they inherited it in her will. Beth reads an article about a string of home invasions where parents are murdered, but daughters are spared. Unbeknownst to the family, they are stalked by someone driving a candy truck.

Shortly after they settle into the house, two intruders break in and attack the mother and daughters. One of them is a large mentally impaired man known as the Fat Man. The other intruder is known as the Candy Truck Woman. Vera is then sexually abused by the Fat Man, while Beth tries to get away but she runs into the Woman. When Beth asks what the Candy Truck Woman wants, she replies, "We just wanna play with dolls." Colleen recovers and kills both intruders.

Sixteen years later, Beth is now a successful horror fiction author living in Chicago with her husband and son. She appears on a talk show to promote her new novel Incident in a Ghostland, based on her experience that night. She receives a frantic phone call from her sister, who has suffered from delusions since the trauma, begging her to return to the house where she still lives with their mother. When Beth arrives, Colleen explains that Vera remains unable to move on and continues reliving that night, locking herself in a padded room in the basement. Beth begins to experience strange dreams, and Vera claims that their tormentors are still trying to get them.

During an episode, Beth finds Vera chained and made up to look like a doll. Colleen calls an ambulance and tells Beth not to listen to Vera. Beth falls asleep and is captured by the Candy Truck Woman. She discovers bruises all over her beaten face and finds Vera also beaten up in the basement. She blames her for the wounds and Vera begs her sister to face the truth. Beth recalls a memory, and it is revealed that the Candy Truck Woman actually killed their mother that night and Beth has been imagining her adult life all this time to disassociate.

In reality, she and Vera are still teenagers and the Fat Man and Candy Truck Woman are holding her and Vera captive in Clarisse's home. The Candy Truck Woman dresses Beth like a doll, leaving her in a room littered with dolls. The Fat Man begins molesting and torturing the dolls. When he gets to Beth, she fights back and flees. She frees Vera and they escape the house. They make it to a road where two state troopers help them, reporting the incident to dispatch. However, both are gunned down by the Candy Truck Woman, who recaptures the girls.

Beth mentally retreats back to her adulthood fantasy. At a cocktail party, she meets her idol, H.P. Lovecraft, who tells Beth that her novel is a masterpiece. Beth sees Vera screaming for help and decides to return to rescue Vera. She escapes from the Fat Man and initiates a violent fight with the Candy Truck Woman. Another state trooper arrives in time to gun down both the Fat Man and the Candy Truck Woman. After authorities arrive, Beth sees a vision of her mother waving at them from the house as the sisters are taken to the hospital.

Cast
 Crystal Reed as Elizabeth "Beth" Keller
 Emilia Jones as Young Beth
 Anastasia Phillips as Vera
 Taylor Hickson as Young Vera
 Mylène Farmer as Colleen
 Kevin Power as Candy Truck Woman
 Rob Archer as Fat Man
 Paul Titley as H.P. Lovecraft

Production
Ghostland is a Canadian and French co-production with Canada providing 69.12% of funding and France providing 30.88%. The film was predominantly shot in Canada.

Accident
In December 2016, actress Taylor Hickson was facially disfigured while shooting a scene for the film. She was rushed to the hospital and received 70 stitches, but was permanently scarred. In March 2018, Hickson sued the film's production company Incident Productions over lost work as a result of the incident. Hickson claimed in the lawsuit that "in the course of shooting the scene, the director Pascal Laugier, consistently told Hickson to pound harder on the glass with her fists". While filming another take, the lawsuit states:

Hickson, in the lawsuit, states that the company failed to take "any and all reasonable steps to ensure that industry standards and practices were adhered to, including but not limited to the use of safety glass and/or stunt doubles as appropriate."

Independent of the pending lawsuits, the Winnipeg-based film company Incident Productions, Inc. pled guilty for "failing to ensure the safety and welfare of a worker under the Workplace Safety and Health Act," and was fined $40,000 by the province of Manitoba.

Release
Ghostland was first shown in competition on 3 February 2018 at the Festival international du film fantastique de Gérardmer. Ghostland won three film awards at the festival, including the Grand Prize, Audience Award, and the SyFy Award. The SyFy award was chosen by five bloggers at the festival. Frédéric Strauss of Télérama noted that this was the second French co-production in a row that dominated the awards at the festival with the previous years big winner being Raw by Julia Ducournau. The film received a theatrical release in France on 14 March 2018. In some territories, the film was released as Ghostland and in others as Incident in a Ghostland.

Reception
The site's critics' consensus reads: "Incident in a Ghost Land may satisfy horror fans in search of a nasty kick, but it's narratively flawed and decidedly not for the squeamish." Metacritic gives the film a weighted average score of 44 out of 100, based on 4 critics, indicating "mixed or average reviews".

The Hollywood Reporter declared the film to be a "taut—if somewhat corny—slasher flick" and it was "neither for the faint of heart nor the sharp of mind". The review noted the dialogue, finding that "for [the director's] second film in English after 2012’s The Tall Man, he could have brushed up more on his dialogue, which rings awfully flat." Dennis Harvey of Variety declared that Ghostland "all seems slick, intense, and unpleasant in the same hollow way "Martyrs" did, because all the cruelty is so meaningless. Replacing that film's empty pseudo-mysticism are villains for whom Laugier doesn't bother providing any motivation or backstory." Simon Abrams of The Village Voice wrote that the film was a "disturbing and effective critique of misogynist torture porn," it "may sometimes play like a mindlessly gory slasher clone, but Laugier’s tormented girls consistently prove to be stronger than their brutalized bodies."

References

External links
 
 

2018 horror films
English-language Canadian films
Films directed by Pascal Laugier
Films shot in Winnipeg
Canadian horror films
French horror films
English-language French films
2010s Canadian films
2010s French films